FLA Live Arena (previously known as the National Car Rental Center, Office Depot Center, BankAtlantic Center, and BB&T Center) is an indoor arena located next to Sawgrass Mills in Sunrise, Florida. It is the home venue for the Florida Panthers of the National Hockey League. It was completed in 1998, at a cost of US$185 million, almost entirely publicly financed, and features 70 suites and 2,623 club seats.

History

In 1992, Wayne Huizenga obtained a new NHL franchise that would eventually become the Florida Panthers. Until the team had an arena of their own, they initially played at the now-demolished Miami Arena, sharing the venue with the NBA's Miami Heat. Sunrise City Manager Pat Salerno made public a $167-million financing and construction plan for a civic center near the Sawgrass Expressway in December 1995, and Broward County approved construction in February 1996. In June 1996, the site was chosen by the Panthers, and in July, Alex Muxo gathered more than a dozen architects, engineers and contractors for the first major design brainstorming session. Architects Ellerbe Becket were given 26 months to build the arena, which had to be ready by August 30, 1998, to accommodate the 1998–99 NHL season. Despite never having designed a facility that had taken less than 31 months from start to finish, they accepted the job.
Seventy suites were completed with wet bars, closed circuit monitors and leather upholstery. Also home to private lounge box seating, all construction activity was generated by over fifty subcontractors and 2.3 million man hours without a single injury. Known as the Broward County Civic Center during construction, the naming rights were won in July 1998 by National Car Rental — a company purchased by Huizenga in January 1997 — leading to the venue being named the National Car Rental Center. A certificate of occupancy was given on September 12, 1998, and the arena opened on October 3, 1998, with a Celine Dion concert. The next day, Elton John performed, and on October 9, 1998, the Florida Panthers had their first home game at their new arena.

As NRC's new parent company, ANC Rental, went bankrupt in 2002, the Panthers sought a new sponsor for the arena. It became the Office Depot Center in the summer of 2002. (Office Depot is an office supply retailing company, which is headquartered in nearby Boca Raton.) Just over three years later, the arena's name changed again; it became the BankAtlantic Center on September 6, 2005. (BankAtlantic was headquartered in nearby Fort Lauderdale.)

Because BB&T purchased BankAtlantic in July 2012, the arena was rebranded as the BB&T Center.

The arena is currently the largest in Florida and second-largest in the Southeastern United States, behind Greensboro Coliseum. During the 2011 offseason, the BB&T Center replaced the original green seats in the lower bowl with new red seats, as a part of the Panthers' "We See Red" campaign.

In October 2012, Sunrise Sports and Entertainment completed installation of the Club Red seating sections encompassing the center ice seats during hockey games. It is an all-inclusive nightclub experience following the trend of other sports and entertainment venues in incorporating high-end seating sections and clubs.

The ADT Club, located on the club level, offers food and beverage. The Penalty Box offers fans another seating and dining option inside the BB&T Center. The Legends Lounge is a restaurant located on the Lexus Suite Level, and offers sit down service.

On May 14, 2013, Broward County voted to fund a new scoreboard for the county-owned arena. On October 11, 2013, the scoreboard made its debut for the Panthers' 2013–14 home opener.

In February 2019, it was announced that BB&T would be merging with SunTrust Banks to form Truist Financial Corporation. The merged company decided to not renew the naming rights agreement after it expired in 2021; the arena will thus have the temporary name of FLA Live Arena until a new rights partner is found.

Concerts

Notable events

NHL
The Florida Panthers hosted the 2001 NHL Entry Draft & 2015 NHL Entry Draft at the arena.
The arena served as the site for the 2003 NHL All-Star Game on February 2, 2003. The Western Conference defeated the Eastern Conference, 6–5, in a shootout victory. It marked the first "official" shootout in the NHL.
The arena was due to host the 2021 NHL All-Star game, but this was cancelled due to the COVID-19 pandemic.
The arena hosted the 2023 NHL All-Star Game on February 4, 2023.

Boxing, mixed martial arts
 
The arena has held boxing and mixed martial arts events such as EliteXC: Heat featuring the main event of Seth Petruzelli and Kimbo Slice took place on October 4, 2008. On February 15, 2009, a lightweight bout between Nate Campbell and Ali Funeka took place in the arena.
 
Strikeforce MMA made their debut at the arena on January 30, 2010, with the Strikeforce: Miami event on Showtime.
 
UFC on FX 3 took place at the arena on June 8, 2012. It was the first UFC event ever held at the arena.
 
UFC Fight Night: Jacaré vs. Hermansson (also known as UFC Fight Night 150 or UFC on ESPN+ 8) took place at the arena on April 27, 2019. It was the first time UFC returned to the arena since 2012.

Professional wrestling
WCW Bash At The Beach - July 11, 1999
WWF Armageddon – December 12, 1999
WWE Armageddon – December 15, 2002

Rodeo
 
The Professional Bull Riders brought their Built Ford Tough Series tour to the BB&T Center in September 2005 for a bull riding event, which was won by Kody Lostroh (who ultimately became the Rookie of the Year that same year).

Other events
On May 23, 2008, Senator Barack Obama held a rally as part of his presidential primary campaign.
Several months later on October 29, Obama returned to the arena to hold a rally as part of his presidential campaign. The rally was presented as a paid programm airing on several major broadcast and cable networks live.
On August 10, 2016, Candidate Donald Trump held a rally as part of his presidential campaign.
On February 21, 2018, the venue hosted a CNN town hall meeting on gun control in response to the Stoneman Douglas High School shooting that occurred a week earlier; it was attended by 7,000 people, including survivors of the shooting and relatives of the victims.
On June 27, 2018, rapper XXXTentacion's fan memorial and public funeral was held at the arena.
 On November 26, 2019, President Donald Trump held a campaign rally.

Regular events

In addition to the Panthers, the arena was formerly home to the Florida Pit Bulls of the American Basketball Association, the Miami Caliente of the Lingerie Football League, and the Florida Bobcats of the AFL, along with the only season of the Florida ThunderCats. This arena also serves as the host for the Orange Bowl Basketball Classic held every December in conjunction with the namesake college football game.

Arena information

Seating
Basketball: 20,737 
Hockey: 19,250
End-Stage Concerts: 15,207 – 23,000
Center-Stage Concerts: 25,000
 of arena floor space for trade shows and other events such as circuses and ice shows.

Parking and loading docks
Total: 7,045 spaces (Does not include production or bus/oversized vehicle parking)
General parking: 4,787 Spaces
Suite/club seat parking: 1,430 spaces
Garage: 226 spaces
Disabled parking: 90 spaces
Event staff: 512 spaces
Truck doors: 5
Waste removal docks: 2

Food and novelty concessions
Plaza Level: 3 food courts and Pantherland Retail
Mezzanine Level: 3 food courts and two points of purchase kiosks

References

External links

 FLA Live Arena
 BB&T Center aerial video

1998 establishments in Florida
American Basketball Association (2000–present) venues
Boxing venues in the United States
Indoor ice hockey venues in Florida
Indoor arenas in Florida
Indoor soccer venues in the United States
Mixed martial arts venues in Florida
Music venues completed in 1998
Music venues in Florida
National Hockey League venues
Sports venues in Broward County, Florida
Sports venues completed in 1998
Sports in Sunrise, Florida
Sunrise, Florida
Florida Panthers